Brutus, also called Brutus the Bear (January 17, 2002 – February 2, 2021), was a grizzly bear (Ursus arctos horribilis) who was adopted as a newborn cub by the naturalist Casey Anderson, star of the National Geographic documentary Expedition Grizzly.

Brutus' story
Brutus was born in January 2002. He spent his first months in a six-foot square steel box that was his mother's cage at a captive bear facility. 

Grizzlies born in captivity are not released into the wild for two primary reasons: First, a captive-born cub lacks the education that would have been provided by its mother during its first two years in the wild; second, a bear born in captivity does not have the same wariness that makes wild bears avoid interactions with humans.

Brutus lived at Montana Grizzly Encounter Rescue and Educational Sanctuary.

Brutus appeared frequently on television with Casey Anderson, including regular appearances as Anderson's "co-host" on the Nat Geo/Nat Geo WILD series. He also appeared in two films, Iron Ridge (2008) and Pretty Ugly People (2008), as well as in commercials and in live educational shows across America.

Brutus died on February 2, 2021, at the age of 19.

See also
 List of individual bears

References

Individual bears
2002 animal births
2021 animal deaths